Robert Maskell Patterson (March 23, 1787 – September 5, 1854) was an American chemist, mathematician, and physician. He was a professor of mathematics, chemistry and natural philosophy at the University of Pennsylvania and professor of natural philosophy at the University of Virginia. He also served as director of the United States Mint and as president of the American Philosophical Society (elected in 1809).

Biography
Born in Philadelphia, to Robert Patterson, a professor at the University of Pennsylvania, and director of the Mint from 1805 to 1824, who had emigrated to the British North American colonies from Ireland. His mother was Amy Hunter Ewing and he was one of eight children of that marriage. Patterson attended the University of Pennsylvania graduating in 1804 with a B.A., followed by his M.D. in 1808. He journeyed to France that year, where he studied with Haüy, Vauquelin, Legendre and Poisson. In 1811, Patterson went to England where he studied with Humphry Davy. Returning to the United States in 1812, he was appointed a professor at the University of Pennsylvania. Patterson remained at Penn until 1828 when he joined the faculty of the University of Virginia. He was elected an Associate Fellow of the American Academy of Arts and Sciences in 1834. Patterson returned to Philadelphia in 1835 to become director of the U.S. Mint. He was asked by a committee of the American Philosophical Society in 1836 to write a brief report on recommendations for astronomical and physics observations to be carried out by the United States Exploring Expedition, which sailed in 1838. Ill health forced him to resign from the Mint in 1851. Patterson died in Philadelphia on September 5, 1854. He is buried at Laurel Hill Cemetery in Philadelphia in Section H, Plot 13, 20, 25 & 26.  He was married to Helen Hamilton Leiper (April 20, 1792 – December 17, 1874), daughter of Thomas Leiper.

Cryptology
Patterson was interested in ciphers and regularly exchanged coded correspondence with Thomas Jefferson.  One of Patterson's ciphers included in a December 19, 1801 dated letter to Jefferson was decoded in 2007 by Lawren Smithline.
The cipher consists of 7 digit pairs and is decoded by decrypting 7 blocks at a time.
The cipher was of the Declaration of Independence, of which Jefferson was the primary author.  Patterson called it his "perfect cipher" and Jefferson considered adopting it for government use.

American Philosophical Society
Patterson was the youngest person elected to the American Philosophical Society at 22 in 1809. Four years later he was elected a secretary, the a vice-president in 1825. He became president in 1849 and served in that capacity until his death.

References

 Frederik Nebeker, Astronomy and the Geophysical Tradition in the United States in the Nineteenth Century: A Guide to Manuscript Sources in the Library of the American Philosophical Society, APS Publication No. 16 (Philadelphia, 1991), p. 75–76.
 Obituary: Proceedings of the American Philosophical Society, Vol. 6, No. 52 (Jul. – Dec., 1854), pp. 60–65

External links
 Robert M. (Robert Maskell) Patterson papers, 1775-1853

1787 births
1854 deaths
19th-century American chemists
19th-century American mathematicians
19th-century American physicians
American people of Irish descent
Burials at Laurel Hill Cemetery (Philadelphia)
Fellows of the American Academy of Arts and Sciences
Directors of the United States Mint
Members of the American Philosophical Society
Mathematicians from Philadelphia
University of Pennsylvania alumni
University of Pennsylvania faculty
University of Virginia faculty
Physicians from Philadelphia
Jackson administration personnel
Van Buren administration personnel
William Henry Harrison administration personnel
Tyler administration personnel
Polk administration personnel
Taylor administration personnel
Fillmore administration personnel